Enar Jääger (born 18 November 1984) is an Estonian former professional footballer who played as a defender.

Club career

Flora
Jääger made his senior league debut in the Esiliiga on 2 April 2000, playing for Flora affiliated Lelle in a 1–3 home loss to Merkuur Tartu. In December 2000, he moved to Flora's reserve side Valga. Jääger made his Flora – and Meistriliiga – debut on 4 November 2001, in a 3–0 away victory over Lootus. He won the Meistriliiga title in the 2003 season.

Torpedo Moscow
On 3 February 2005, Jääger signed a three-year contract with Russian Premier League club Torpedo Moscow for an undisclosed fee, becoming third Estonian player in the club after Andres Oper and Andrei Stepanov. He made his debut in Russian Premier League on 13 March, in a 3–1 home win over Rostov.

Aalesund
On 8 March 2007, Jääger signed a two-and-a-half-year contract with Norwegian club Aalesund for an undisclosed fee. He made his debut in the Tippeligaen on 16 May 2007, in a 4–0 away victory over Strømsgodset.

Ascoli
On 19 July 2009, Jääger signed for Serie B club Ascoli on a three-year deal. He made his debut in the Serie B on 21 August 2009, in 1–1 home draw against Gallipoli. Jääger failed to become a regular starter for Ascoli and was released by the club on 31 January 2010, after making just five league appearances.

Return to Aalesund
After rejecting an offer from Major League Soccer club New York Red Bulls, Jääger returned to Norway, where he signed a two-year contract with Aalesund on 5 March 2010. On 6 November 2011, Jääger assisted the opening goal in Aalesund's 2–1 victory over Brann in the Norwegian Cup final, winning his first trophy with the club. He didn't extend his contract after the 2011 season.

On 5 January 2012, Jääger passed a medical examination at Ekstraklasa club Lechia Gdańsk, but rejected the contract offer to pursue other options. He then had a trial with the Scottish Premier League champions Rangers. Rangers manager Ally McCoist was impressed with Jääger and was keen on signing him, but the player had to leave the club without an offer as Rangers failed to reduce their wage bill in order to make room for new players. Despite interest from Championship sides Crystal Palace and Leeds United, and League One side Charlton Athletic, Jääger failed to secure a contract by March 2012.

On 13 March 2012, Jääger signed a one-year contract with Aalesund, after receiving an improved offer from his former club.

Lierse
On 15 July 2013, Jääger signed a one-year contract with Belgian Pro League club Lierse, with an option to extend it for another year. He made his debut for the club on 27 July, in a 1–2 home loss to Zulte Waregem.

Return to Flora
In December 2014, Jääger joined the Flora first-team squad for training sessions. On 5 March 2015, he signed a one-year contract with the club. Jääger was named club captain ahead of the 2015 season.

Vålerenga
On 18 August 2015, Jääger signed for Tippeligaen club Vålerenga for the remainder of the 2015 season. He made his Vålerenga debut on 28 August, in 0–2 away loss to his former club Aalesund. On 4 January 2016, Jääger extended his contract for a year. On 30 March 2017, he extended his contract for another year.

Second return to Flora
On 14 June 2019, Jääger once again returned to Flora, signing a contract for the rest of the season. Jääger was part of Flora's championship-winning 2019 Meistriliiga season, repeating as champions of the COVID-19 pandemic shortened 2020 Meistriliiga season. Jääger announced his retirement on 5 December 2020, following the club's final game of the season.

International career
Jääger began his youth career in 2000 with the Estonia under-16 team. He also represented the under-19, under-20, and under-21 national sides.

Jääger made his senior international debut for Estonia on 12 October 2002, when he came on as a 69th-minute substitute for Marko Kristal in a 3–2 home victory over New Zealand in a friendly. He made his 100th appearance for Estonia on 19 November 2013, a day after his 29th birthday, in a 3–0 friendly away win over Liechtenstein.

Career statistics

Club

International

Honours
Valga
Esiliiga: 2002

Flora
Meistriliiga: 2003, 2019, 2020
Estonian Supercup: 2003, 2004

Aalesund
Norwegian Cup: 2011

See also
 List of men's footballers with 100 or more international caps

References

External links

Enar Jääger at altomfotball.no 

1984 births
Living people
People from Kohila
Estonian footballers
Association football defenders
Esiliiga players
FC Valga players
Meistriliiga players
FC Flora players
Russian Premier League players
FC Torpedo Moscow players
Eliteserien players
Aalesunds FK players
Vålerenga Fotball players
Serie B players
Ascoli Calcio 1898 F.C. players
Belgian Pro League players
Lierse S.K. players
Norwegian Second Division players
Estonia youth international footballers
Estonia under-21 international footballers
Estonia international footballers
FIFA Century Club
Estonian expatriate footballers
Estonian expatriate sportspeople in Russia
Expatriate footballers in Russia
Estonian expatriate sportspeople in Norway
Expatriate footballers in Norway
Estonian expatriate sportspeople in Italy
Expatriate footballers in Italy
Estonian expatriate sportspeople in Belgium
Expatriate footballers in Belgium